Prince Abubakar Audu University,(Formerly Kogi State University) located at Anyigba, is the state-owned university of Kogi, Nigeria. It was established in 1999 by Prince Abubakar Audu, the former governor of the state. At the time of its establishment, it was known as Kogi State University, It was later named Prince Abubakar Audu University (PAAU) in 2002, after the then sitting governor of Kogi State,  who heralded its establishment, and later renamed Kogi State University (KSU) in 2003 by the former governor Ibrahim Idris and subsequently renamed as Prince Abubakar Audu University in 2020 by Governor Alhaji Yahaya Adoza Bello in respect of late Abubakar Audu.

Professor S.K. Okwute (Professor of Chemistry) was the pioneer Vice Chancellor (2000-2005) and currently back to University of Abuja. Professor F.S. Idachaba (OFR), Professor of Agric-Economics, took over between 2005 and 2008 and then retired to work in his foundation (F.S. Idachaba Foundation for Research and Scholarship) before his death. Professor I. Isah (Professor of Chemical Pathology), from Ahmadu Bello University, Zaria, took over in October 2008, he was succeeded by Prof. Mohammed Abdulkadir from Ado Bayero University. The incumbent Vice Chancellor is Professor Marietu Tenuche.

In 2017 the Academic  Staff Union of University (ASUU) KSU chapter was locked in an industrial crisis with the state government over non payment of salaries for several months. The state government accused the lecturers of politicising the industrial dispute and ordered their immediate return to class room or would their  positions declared vacant for fresh applications. After several days of refusal to return to the class, Governor Bello who is Visitor to the school announced the proscription of ASUU and its withdrawal from the national ASUU.

Faculties (Colleges) 
Prince Abubakar Audu University has seven (7) faculties

Agriculture 

 Agricultural Economics & Extension
 Crop production
 Animal Production
 Fisheries and Aquaculture
 Soil & Environmental Management
 Food Science & Technology
 Home Science

Arts and Humanities 

 History and International studies
 English and Literary Study
 Theater Art
 Arabic 
 Philosophy

Law 

 Common law
 Islamic Law

Social Sciences 

 Mass Communications
 Economics
 Political Science
 Sociology 
 Geography and Planning

Education 

 Mathematics Education
 Chemistry Education
 Physics Education
 Biology Education
 CRS Education
 Islamic Education
 Library and Information Sciences
 Human Kinetics and Health Education
 Social studies education
 Economics Education
 English Education
 Geography Education

Natural Sciences 

 Mathematical Sciences & Statistics
 Pure and Industrial Chemistry
 Physics
 Plant and Biotechnology
 Geology
 Microbiology
 Biochemistry
 Animal and Environmental Biology
 Computer Science

Management Science 

Accounting
 Banking and Finance
 Public Administration
Business Administration

Prince Abubakar Audu University commenced academic activities in April, 2000 with six faculties: Faculties of Agriculture, Arts and Humanities, Law, Management Sciences, Natural Sciences and Social Sciences. The university added the establishment of Faculty of Medicine with extensive office and laboratory complexes.  The Centre for Pre-Degree and Diploma Studies was established under the present University administration to run diploma and pre-degree programmes.  Students of the pre-degree programme could gain admission into the degree programme if they are successful in the internal exams and need not write the Post-UTME exams.

All the faculties and centre for Remedial Studies and Diploma are in one place because the university is planned to be a city of its own. There are no satellite campuses. However there are clamours that the university be decentralised by moving some of its faculties especially College of Medicine to either western or Central part of the state.

The university offers many courses on such topics as medicine, law, microbiology, biochemistry, geology (combined engineering and geosciences), physics, mathematics, computer sciences, public administration, human kinetics, industrial chemistry, statistics, business administration, accounting, banking and finance, theatre arts, food, nutrition and home sciences, agricultural engineering, crop production, animal production, soil science, food science and technology, fishery and forestry, Islamic studies, religion and philosophy, English, history and international studies, sociology, mass communication, economics, and chemistry.  98% of the courses offered in the university are accredited by the Nigeria University Commission (NUC).

Although not very popular, the university is one of the best in Africa, with some of its departments being ranked by Nigerian professional and academic bodies as the best in Nigeria. Some few years ago, the Faculty of law was pronounced as the best in Nigeria, and has remained among the best in subsequent years. Also the department of Geology has been rated as one of the best in Africa, alongside Obafemi Awolowo University, and the University of Ibadan. Presently, it hosts a library which is home to a large collection of expensive specialized books, materials, and a Geologic station, both contributed by Shell Petroleum Development Company as an appreciation of the department's exceptionally-strong intellectual capacity development attitude.

The university also boasts facilities which according to undisclosed sources, are accessible to students for academic research, a privilege very uncommon among other Nigerian universities. Notable is the University's E-library; a large heavily-equipped structure which is stand-alone and separate from the school's main library. Sources have it that there a few other Nigerian universities such as Covenant University (private university)  that boast a stand-alone E-library.

Despite inadequate funding which is the major challenge of state owned universities compared to federal universities, KSU has been named the university with the best implementation of resources for development by the Knowledge for Impact Foundation.

Students 
The Institution started with a student population of about 751in 2000, but which as at 2009/2010 admission exercise has grown to about 16,000, and now stands at about 50,000 in 2016. It is also known as one of the fairest universities in its admission exercise, admitting students strictly by merit, and supplementarily by near-merit. It has been ranked as Nigeria's fastest developing university, and one of such, in Africa. The university like many others has a functional Student Union Government (SUG). In 2014 however the SUG was suspended due to violence during the elections and was later reinstated in 2016 (it was run by an interim government until then). The next election was a lot more successful and produced Phillip Omepa as the president and Suleiman, Farouq Omale as the Director of Welfare. In 2018 Governor Yahaya Bello was accused of plotting to impose hand picked candidates as the leaders of the students union.

Although not as popular as its federal counterparts like the University of Lagos, Obafemi Awolowo University, and Ahmadu Bello University, Kogi State University has been named by many multinational corporate bodies as one of Africa's BEST universities based on the exceptional intellectual pedigree of its employed graduates. As at January 2017, the university officially dismembered itself from the 
Academic Staff Union of Universities: the umbrella body for academic staff members of Nigerian universities. As such,  academic programmes have become stable and fast, without the incessant strike actions characteristic of ASUU-member universities. Updated = 2019

See also
Federal University, Lokoja

References

External links
 
 Confluence University

 
Kogi State
Educational institutions established in 1999
1999 establishments in Nigeria